The 2018 elections for the Illinois House of Representatives took place on Tuesday, November 6, 2018 to elect representatives from all 118 districts.  The winners of this election served in the 101st General Assembly, with seats apportioned among the states based on the 2010 United States census. The Democratic Party has held a House majority since 1997. The inauguration of the 101st General Assembly occurred on Wednesday January 9, 2019. The Democrats flipped 8 seats while Republicans flipped 1 seat, resulting in a net gain of 7 seats for the Democratic caucus.

The elections for Illinois's 18 congressional districts, Governor and Lieutenant Governor, statewide constitutional officers, and the Illinois Senate were also held on this date.

Results

Retirements

The Illinois House of Representatives saw 28 Representatives (14 Democratic and 14 Republican) choose to either retire or not run before the 2018 election.

Democratic retirements
 4th district: Cynthia Soto: Soto is running for a seat on the Metropolitan Water Reclamation District.
 5th district: Juliana Stratton: Stratton became J. B. Pritzker's running mate in the 2018 gubernatorial election.
 17th district: Laura Fine: On July 28, 2017, Fine announced her intention to run for the senate seat being vacated by Daniel Biss.
 21st district: Silvana Tabares: On June 15, 2018, Tabares was appointed as the 23rd Ward alderman of Chicago after Mike Zalewski retired from the position on May 31, 2018.
 25th district: Barbara Flynn Currie: Majority Leader Barbara Flynn Currie, the longest tenured female legislator in Illinois history, announced she would retire.
 34th district: Elgie Sims: After State Senator Donne Trotter announced his retirement, Sims was appointed to his seat and sworn in on January 26, 2018.
 38th district: Al Riley: On September 26, 2017, Riley announced he would not seek reelection to a seventh term.
 57th district: Elaine Nekritz announced she was planning to resign. Her official resignation became effective October 2, 2017.
 58th district: Scott Drury: Drury attempted to run for Governor of Illinois, but opted to run for Illinois Attorney General after the retirement of Lisa Madigan.
 59th district: Carol Sente: Sente announced she will not run for reelection on September 12, 2017. 
 67th district: Litesa Wallace: Wallace became Daniel Biss's running mate in the 2018 gubernatorial election.
 85th district: Emily McAsey: McAsey resigned from her seat on June 2, 2017 to, according to the Daily Southtown, "join her husband who accepted a job out of state."
 111th district: Dan Beiser: On August 30, 2017, Beiser announced his retirement from the Illinois House of Representatives. Beiser chose to resign in December 2017, and was succeeded by Monica Bristow.
 118th district: Brandon Phelps: Phelps resigned in September 2017. Natalie Phelps Finnie was appointed to succeed him.

Republican retirements
42nd district: Jeanne Ives: In October 2017, Jeanne Ives announced her intention to run for the Republican nomination for Illinois Governor in 2018, adding that she had stopped distributing petitions for state representative.
 47th district: Patti Bellock: On August 1, 2017, Deputy Republican Leader Bellock announced her intention to retire at the end of her term.
 49th district: Mike Fortner: Fortner announced August 7, 2017 he would not seek reelection.
 51st district: Nick Sauer: On August 1, 2018, Politico reported on Sauer allegedly using his ex-girlfriend's nude photos to catfish for seeking online relationships with men. Sauer would then resign at 5 pm on the same day.
53rd district: David Harris: On October 4, 2017, Harris announced his retirement from the Illinois House citing frustration from the Illinois Budget Impasse. Harris was one of the Republicans who crossed party lines to vote to end the Illinois Budget Impasse which included an income tax increase.
 64th district: Barbara Wheeler: Wheeler will not run for reelection in 2018.
 65th district: Steven Andersson: On August 16, 2017, Andersson announced he would not seek reelection to the Illinois House of Representatives in 2018 during an appearance on Chicago Tonight. Andersson was one of the Republicans who voted to end the Illinois budget impasse which included an income tax increase.
 70th district: Bob Pritchard: The 72 year old legislator announced he would retire at the end of the 100th General Assembly. Pritchard was one of the Republicans who voted to end the Illinois budget impasse which included an income tax increase.
 89th district: Brian W. Stewart: Stewart is vacating his seat to run for the senate seat being vacated by Tim Bivins.
 99th district: Sara Wojcicki Jimenez: Wojcicki Jimenez announced she would not seek reelection in 2018.
 101st district: Bill Mitchell: The Assistant Republican Leader announced he would not run for another term in the Illinois House on August 3, 2017.
 104th district: Chad Hays: On July 7, 2017, Hays announced his retirement from the Illinois House citing the budget impasse.
 107th district: John Cavaletto: On September 18, 2017, Cavaletto announced he would not be seeking reelection.
 110th district: Reggie Phillips: On September 22, 2017, Phillips announced he would not run for a third term.

District index

Districts 1–25

District 1
The 1st district, located in the Chicago area, includes parts of Forest View, as well as all or parts of the Chicago neighborhoods of Archer Heights, Brighton Park, Chicago Lawn, Garfield Ridge, New City, and West Elsdon. The district had been represented by Democrat Daniel J. Burke since January 9, 2013, previously serving the 23rd district from January 9, 1991 to January 9, 2013. Burke faced a primary challenger from Aaron Ortiz, a teacher and college counselor for Back of the Yards High School. After defeating Burke in the primary, Ortiz faced no Republican challenger.

District 2
The 2nd district includes all or parts of the Chicago neighborhoods of Armour Square, Bridgeport, Brighton Park, Lower West Side, McKinley Park, Near South Side, Near West Side, and New City. The district has been represented by Democrat Theresa Mah since January 11, 2017. Mah faced neither a Democratic challenger in her primary election nor a Republican challenger in the general election.

District 3
The 3rd district, located in the Chicago area, includes parts of Elmwood Park, as well as all or parts of the Chicago neighborhoods of Austin, Belmont Cragin, Dunning, Hermosa, Logan Square, Montclare, and Portage Park. The district has been represented by Democrat Luis Arroyo since his appointment in December 2006. He was an Assistant Majority Leader of the Illinois House of Representatives during the 100th General Assembly. Arroyo faced neither a Democratic challenger in his primary nor a Republican challenger in the general election.

District 4
The 4th district includes parts of the Chicago neighborhoods of Hermosa, Humboldt Park, Logan Square, and West Town. The district had been represented by Democrat Cynthia Soto since January 10, 2001. Soto would run for commissioner of the Metropolitan Water Reclamation District of Greater Chicago and would not run for re-election for her seat. The Democratic primary for the 4th district seat featured four candidates.
 Iris J. Millán, Community Affairs Liaison for Wilbur Wright College, former Community Development Manager of St. Joseph Services, and former Director of Community Affairs for the 1st Ward Office for the City of Chicago.
 Alyx S. Pattison, Campaign staffer and Congressional Aide to Congresswoman Jan Schakowsky, former Local School Council Member and tutor of Jose de Diego Community Academy, Wicker Park, and former Commissioner of the Cook County Commission on Women's Issues.
 Delia C. Ramirez, former Campaign Chair for Irizarry for 26th Ward Alderman, former Deputy Director of the Community Renewal Society, and former Executive Director of the Center for Changing Lives.
 Anne Shaw, Community Activist and Civil Rights Attorney.
After winning her primary election, Ramirez would face no Republican challenger in the general election.

District 5
The 5th district includes parts of the Chicago neighborhoods of Armour Square, Avalon Park, Douglas, Englewood, Fuller Park, Grand Boulevard, Greater Grand Crossing, Loop, Near North Side, Near South Side, South Shore, Washington Park, and Woodlawn. The district had been represented by Democrat Juliana Stratton since January 11, 2017. Stratton would later on become Governor J.B. Pritzker's running mate for lieutenant governor, leaving her seat open. The Democratic primary for the 5th district seat featured four candidates.
 Felicia Bullock, first-time candidate and procurement buyer.
 Ken Dunkin, former representative of the 5th district, losing his primary race in 2016 to former representative Juliana Stratton.
 Lamont Robinson, small business owner, Director of the Kappa Leadership Institute based out of Kenwood High School, and member of the 51st Street Business Association.
 Dilara Sayeed, first-time candidate and volunteer for several campaigns and candidates over 15 years, educator, and tech entrepreneur.
After winning his primary election, Robinson would face no Republican challenger in the general election. Through his election and swearing-in, Lamont Robinson made history by becoming the first openly LGBTQ person of color to serve in the Illinois General Assembly.

District 6
The 6th district includes parts of the Chicago neighborhoods of Armour Square, Bridgeport, Chicago Lawn, Douglas, Englewood, Fuller Park, Grand Boulevard, Greater Grand Crossing, Loop, Near North Side, Near South Side, Near West Side, New City, and West Englewood. The district has been represented by Democrat Sonya Harper since her appointment in October 2015. Harper faced neither a Democratic challenger in her primary nor a Republican challenger in the general election.

District 7
The 7th district, located in the Chicago area, includes all or parts of Bellwood, Berkeley, Broadview, Forest Park, Hillside, La Grange Park, Maywood, Melrose Park, Northlake, Oak Brook, River Forest, Westchester, and Western Springs. The district has been represented by Democrat Emanuel "Chris" Welch since January 9, 2013. Welch faced neither any Democratic challenger in his primary nor any Republican challenger in the general election.

District 8
The 8th district, located in the Chicago area, includes all or parts of Berwyn, Brookfield, Forest Park, La Grange, La Grange Park, North Riverside, and Oak Park and parts of the Chicago neighborhood of Austin. The district has been represented by Democrat La Shawn Ford since January 10, 2007. Ford faced neither a Democratic challenger in his primary nor any Republican challenger in the general election.

District 9
The 9th district includes parts of the Chicago neighborhoods of East Garfield Park, Lincoln Park, Loop, Lower West Side, Near North Side, Near West Side, North Lawndale, South Lawndale, West Garfield Park, and West Town. The district has been represented by Democrat Art Turner since December 2010. He was the Deputy Majority Leader of the Illinois House of Representatives during the 100th General Assembly. Turner faced neither any Democratic challenger in his primary nor any Republican challenger in the general election.

District 10
The 10th district includes parts of the Chicago neighborhoods of Austin, East Garfield Park, Humboldt Park, Lincoln Park, Logan Square, Near North Side, Near West Side, West Garfield Park, and West Town. The district has been represented by Democrat Melissa Conyears-Ervin since January 11, 2017. Conyears-Ervin faced neither any Democratic challenger in her primary nor any Republican challenger in the general election.

District 11
The 11th district includes parts of the Chicago neighborhoods of Albany Park, Avondale, Irving Park, Lake View, Lincoln Park, Lincoln Square, Logan Square, and North Center. The district has been represented by Democrat Ann Williams since January 12, 2011. Williams faced neither any Democratic challenger in her primary nor any Republican challenger in the general election.

District 12
The 12th district includes parts of the Chicago neighborhoods of Lake View, Lincoln Park, Near North Side, and Uptown. The district has been represented by Democrat Sara Feigenholtz since January 11, 1995. Feigenholtz faced neither any Democratic challenger in her primary nor any Republican challenger in the general election.

District 13
The 13th district includes parts of the Chicago neighborhoods of Albany Park, Edgewater, Lake View, North Center, North Park, Rogers Park, Uptown, and West Ridge. The district has been represented by Democrat Greg Harris since December 2006. He was an Assistant Majority Leader of the Illinois House of Representatives during the 100th General Assembly. Harris faced neither any Democratic challenger in his primary nor any Republican challenger in the general election.

District 14
The 14th district, located in the Chicago area, includes parts of Evanston and includes parts of the Chicago neighborhoods of Edgewater, Rogers Park, Uptown, and West Ridge. The district has been represented by Democrat Kelly Cassidy since her appointment in May 2011. Cassidy faced a primary challenger from Arthur Noah Siegel, former worker on Bernie Sanders' campaign and business owner in construction. After winning her primary election, Cassidy would not face any Republican challenger in the general election.

District 15
The 15th district, located in the Chicago area, includes parts of Glenview, Morton Grove, Niles, Park Ridge, and Skokie and includes parts of the Chicago neighborhoods of Albany Park, Forest Glen, Irving Park, Jefferson Park, North Park, and Norwood Park. The district has been represented by Democrat John D'Amico since November 2004. D'Amico faced a Republican challenger from Amanda Biela, a first-time candidate, former Chicago public school teacher, and past president of the local parenting organization Moms Club of Northwest Chicagoland.

District 16
The 16th district, located in the Chicago area, includes parts of Lincolnwood, Morton Grove, and Skokie and includes parts of the Chicago neighborhoods of North Park and West Ridge. The district had been represented by Democrat Lou Lang since his appointment in July 1987. Lang faced neither any Democratic challenger in his primary nor any Republican challenger in the general election. After winning his election, Lang would resign two days before his inauguration to work as a lobbyist. Yehiel Mark Kalish was appointed to fill the seat.

District 17
The 17th district, located in the Chicago area, includes all or parts of Evanston, Glenview, Golf, Morton Grove, Northbrook, Skokie, and Wilmette. The district had been represented by Democrat Laura Fine since January 9, 2013. On July 28, 2017, Fine announced her intention to run for the senate seat being vacated by Daniel Biss, leaving her seat open. The Democratic primary for the 17th district seat featured five candidates.
 Candance Chow, Evanston/Skokie District 65 school board president.
 Pete Dagher, former Deputy Political Director of the Democratic National Committee, former Director of Special Projects at the White House, and former staffer for President Bill Clinton.
 Alexandra Eidenberg, President & Co-Founder of The Insurance People, founder of We Will, and has worked on campaigns for Illinois Representative Robert Martwick, US Representative Chuy Garcia, and US Senator Bernie Sanders.
 Jennifer Gong-Gershowitz, pro bono attorney for the National Immigrant Justice Center, founding member and co-chair of the Illinois Unaccompanied Children's Task Force, and Board Member of the Glenview Education Foundation.
 Mary Rita Luecke, attorney, precinct volunteer for Niles Township Democratic Party, and former member of Evanston/Skokie District School Board.
The Republican primary for the 17th district seat featured Peter Lee, attorney and president of the Korean Association of Chicago.

District 18
The 18th district, located in the Chicago area, includes all or parts of Deerfield, Evanston, Glencoe, Glenview, Kenilworth, Northbrook, Northfield, Wilmette, and Winnetka. The district has been represented by Democrat Robyn Gabel since her appointment in April 2010. The Republican challenger in this election was Julie Cho, an operations consultant.

District 19
The 19th district, located in the Chicago area, includes parts of Elmwood Park, Harwood Heights, Norridge, and River Grove and includes parts of the Chicago neighborhoods of Dunning, Forest Glen, Jefferson Park, Norwood Park, O'Hare, and Portage Park. The district has been represented by Democrat Robert Martwick since January 9, 2013. Martwick faced a primary challenger from Jeffrey La Porte, police officer, former Director for the Gladstone Park Chamber of Commerce, and former Parent Representative for Onahan Elementary LSC. The Republican challenger in this election was Ammie Kessem, sergeant of police and an active parishioner of the St. Monica Catholic Church.

District 20
The 20th district, located in the Chicago area, includes parts of Des Plaines, Franklin Park, Harwood Heights, Niles, Norridge, Park Ridge, Rosemont, and Schiller Park and includes parts of the Chicago neighborhoods of Dunning, Edison Park, Norwood Park, and O'Hare. The district has been represented by Republican Michael McAuliffe since his appointment in July 1996. He was the Assistant Republican Leader of the Illinois House of Representatives during the 100th General Assembly. McAuliffe is the only Republican to serve parts of Chicago in the Illinois House. According to Illinois Election Data, the 20th district was the most Democratic district represented by a Republican during the election. The Democratic challenger in this election was Merry Marwig, former Democratic candidate for this district in 2016 and owner of a data security company. After winning her primary, Marwig announced she would step down from the race, saying “changing circumstances in my family have forced me to reconsider my run.” After Marwig stepped down from the race, McAuliffe would face no other Democratic challenger in the general election.

District 21
The 21st district, located in the Chicago area, includes parts of Bedford Park, Bridgeview, Cicero, Forest View, Lyons, McCook, Riverside, Stickney, and Summit and includes parts of the Chicago neighborhoods of Brighton Park, Garfield Ridge, Lower West Side, McKinley Park, and South Lawndale. The district had been represented by Democrat Silvana Tabares since January 9, 2013. After winning her primary, Tabares was appointed as the 23rd Ward alderman of Chicago on June 15, 2018 after Mike Zalewski retired from the position on May 31, 2018. Celina Villanueva, youth engagement manager for the Illinois Coalition for Immigrant and Refugee Rights (ICIRR) and former director of Organizing for Chicago Votes was appointed July 24, 2018 to the state representative seat. Villanueva faced no Republican challenger in the general election.

District 22
The 22nd district, located in the Chicago area, includes parts of Bedford Park and Burbank and includes all or parts of the Chicago neighborhoods of Archer Heights, Ashburn, Brighton Park, Chicago Lawn, Clearing, Gage Park, Garfield Ridge, West Elsdon, and West Lawn. The district has been represented by Mike Madigan since January 13, 1971. He was the 67th Speaker of the House from 1983 to 1995 and has been the 69th Speaker of the House since 1997. He has been chairman of the Democratic Party of Illinois since 1998. Madigan faced neither any Democratic challengers in his primary nor any Republican challenger in the general election.

District 23
The 23rd district, located in the Chicago area, includes parts of Bedford Park, Berwyn, Bridgeview, Brookfield, Burbank, Cicero, Countryside, Hickory Hills, Hodgkins, Justice, La Grange, La Grange Park, McCook, Riverside, and Summit. The district has been represented by Democrat Michael Zalewski since December 2008. Zalewski faced neither any Democratic challengers in his primary nor any Republican challenger in the general election.

District 24
The 24th district, located in the Chicago area, includes parts of Berwyn, Brookfield, Cicero, Riverside, and Stickney and includes parts of the Chicago neighborhood of South Lawndale. The district has been represented by Democrat Elizabeth "Lisa" Hernandez since January 10, 2007. Hernandez faced a primary challenger from Robert Rafael Reyes, Vice President of Realty of Chicago, worked on Antonio Villaraigosa’s Mayoral Campaign in Los Angeles, and an alumnus of the Congressional Hispanic Caucus Institute D.C. After winning her primary, Hernandez would face no Republican challenger in the general election.

District 25
The 25th district includes parts of the Chicago neighborhoods of Calumet Heights, East Side, Hegewisch, Hyde Park, Kenwood, South Chicago, South Deering, South Shore, and Woodlawn. The district had been represented by Democrat Barbara Flynn Currie since January 13, 1993. She had served the Illinois House since January 1979. She had been Majority Leader of the Illinois House since 1997. Currie announced she would be retiring from the House and would not run for re-election. As a result of the seat of a major political player in the Illinois House now being open, the Democratic primary for the seat was very crowded. The primary featured seven candidates:
 William Calloway, community leader, activist, and one of Laquan McDonald Video Revealers.
 Angelique Collins, small business owner, lobbyist, and member of Alpha Kappa Alpha sorority
 Adrienne Irmer, former Legislative Coordinator to the Cook County Bureau of Asset Management, a 2018 Emerging Leader with the Chicago Council on Global Affairs, and involved with several social causes for over 16 years.
 Anne Marie Miles, attorney and Aldermanic candidate for 5th Ward of Chicago in 2011 and 2015.
 Grace Chan McKibben, Development Director at Indo-American Center, former Chief of Staff at Illinois Department of Employment Security, and former Deputy Director at Chinese American Service League.
 Flynn Rush, Community Outreach Specialist for the Cook County Assessors Office, Employment Specialist for the Rebirth of Englewood Community Development Corporation, and Precinct Captain, Area Coordinator for various campaigns including Barack Obama, Bill Clinton and Harold Washington.
 Curtis Tarver II, trial attorney, Board of Trustees Member of Depaul USA, and member of the Chairman's Advisory Council for Big Shoulders Fund.
After winning his primary, Tarver would not face a Republican challenger in the general election.

Districts 26–50

District 26
The 26th district includes parts of the Chicago neighborhoods of Calumet Heights, Douglas, Grand Boulevard, Hyde Park, Kenwood, Loop, Near North Side, Near South Side, South Chicago, South Shore, Washington Park, and Woodlawn. The district had been represented by Democrat Christian Mitchell since January 9, 2013. Mitchell faced neither any Democratic challengers in his primary nor any Republican challenger in the general election. After winning his election and the election of Governor J.B. Pritzker, Mitchell would join the Pritzker administration as a deputy governor. Kam Buckner was appointed to serve out the remainder of Mitchell's term.

District 27
The 27th district, located in the Chicago area, includes parts of Alsip, Blue Island, Crestwood, Midlothian, Orland Park, Palos Heights, Robbins, and Worth and parts of the Chicago neighborhoods of Auburn Gresham, Beverly, Chatham, Morgan Park, Roseland, Washington Heights, and West Pullman. The district has been represented by Democrat Justin Slaughter since his appointment in January 2017. Slaughter faced a primary challenger from Tawana J. (T.J.) Robinson, a special education teacher, former campaigner with LSC members of the Riverdale School District 133, and former campaigner with the various school board members of District 205 Proviso Township High Schools. After winning his primary, Slaughter would face no Republican challenger in the general election.

District 28
The 28th district, located in the Chicago area, includes parts of Blue Island, Calumet Park, Crestwood, Midlothian, Oak Forest, Orland Park, Riverdale, Robbins, and Tinley Park and parts of the Chicago neighborhoods of Morgan Park, Roseland, and West Pullman. The district has been represented by Democrat Robert Rita since January 8, 2003. Rita faced two challengers in his primary election. Mary Carvlin, teacher, Blue Island Library Board trustee for 6 years, and founder of Northeast Blue Island Resident Action Group (now a Rain Ready / CNT group) to solve flooding issues. Kimberly Nicole Koschnitzky, a Connected Vehicle Specialist for General Motors. As a result of the ongoing Me Too movement, Rita's past domestic battery case with a former girlfriend came back into the limelight, previously being at the center of his 2002 election to the seat, as his aforementioned former girlfriend sides with Rita's primary challenger Carvlin. Carvlin would accuse fellow primary challenger Koschnitzky of being a 'ghost candidate' from Speaker Mike Madigan to split the vote between Carvlin and Koschnitzky to guarantee Rita won in the primary. After winning his primary election, Rita would face no Republican challenger in the general election.

District 29
The 29th district, located in the Chicago area, includes parts of Calumet Heights, Chicago Heights, Crete, Dolton, East Hazel Crest, Ford Heights, Glenwood, Harvey, Homewood, Lansing, Lynwood, Monee, Phoenix, Sauk Village, South Chicago Heights, South Holland, Steger, Thornton, and University Park and parts of the Chicago neighborhoods of Riverdale and West Pullman. The district has been represented by Democrat Thaddeus Jones since January 12, 2011. Jones faced a primary challenger from Corean Davis, a human resource professional. After winning his primary, Jones would face no Republican challenger in the general election.

District 30
The 30th district, located in the Chicago area, includes all or parts of Blue Island, Dixmoor, Dolton, East Hazel Crest, Flossmoor, Harvey, Hazel Crest, Homewood, Markham, Midlothian, Oak Forest, Phoenix, Posen, Riverdale, and Robbins. The district has been represented by Democrat Will Davis since January 8, 2003. Davis faced neither a Democratic challenger in his primary nor a Republican challenger in the general election.

District 31
The 31st district, located in the Chicago area, includes parts of Bedford Park, Bridgeview, Burr Ridge, Chicago Ridge, Countryside, Hickory Hills, Hodgkins, Hometown, Indian Head Park, Justice, Oak Lawn, Palos Hills, and Willow Springs and parts of the Chicago neighborhoods of Ashburn, Auburn Gresham, Chatham, Chicago Lawn, Englewood, Greater Grand Crossing, and West Englewood. The district has been represented by Democrat Mary E. Flowers since January 9, 1985. She was an Assistant Majority Leader of the Illinois House during the 100th General Assembly. She faced a primary challenger from Willie Preston, carpenter, Community Representative for Scott Joplin Elementary School, and former community organizer for SouthSiders Organized for Unity and Liberation (SOUL). After winning her primary, Flowers would face no Republican challenger in the general election.

District 32
The 32nd district, located in the Chicago area, includes parts of Bridgeview, Burbank, Hickory Hills, Justice, and Oak Lawn and includes parts of the Chicago neighborhoods of Ashburn, Chicago Lawn, Englewood, Greater Grand Crossing, West Englewood, and Woodlawn. The district has been represented by Democrat Andre Thapedi since January 14, 2009. Thapedi faced neither any challengers in his primary nor any Republican challenger in the general election.

District 33
The 33rd district, located in the Chicago area, includes parts of Burnham, Calumet City, Ford Heights, Lansing, Lynwood, and Sauk Village and includes all or parts of the Chicago neighborhoods of Avalon Park, Burnside, Calumet Heights, Chatham, East Side, Hegewisch, South Chicago, and South Deering. The district has been represented by Democrat Marcus C. Evans Jr. since his appointment in April 2012. Evans Jr. faced neither any challengers in his primary nor any Republican challenger in the general election.

District 34
The 34th district, located in the Chicago area, includes all or parts of Beecher, Bourbonnais, Burnham, Calumet City, Crete, Ford Heights, Grant Park, Lansing, Lynwood, Manteno, Momence, Peotone, Sauk Village, South Holland, and Willowbrook and includes all or parts of the Chicago neighborhoods of Chatham, Greater Grand Crossing, Hegewisch, Pullman, Riverdale, Roseland, South Deering, and West Pullman. The district had been represented by Democrat Elgie Sims since his appointment in August 2012. After State Senator Donne Trotter announced his retirement, Sims was appointed to his seat and sworn in on January 26, 2018. Nicholas Smith, former Chicago 9th Ward Streets & Sanitation Superintendent, Legislative Aide to the Committee on Transportation and Public Way, and Community Liaison/ Coordinator for Chicago State University was appointed to the seat in February 2018. Smith did not face any Republican challenger in the general election.

District 35
The 35th district, located in the Chicago area, includes all or parts of Alsip, Chicago Ridge, Merrionette Park, Oak Lawn, Orland Hills, Orland Park, Palos Heights, Palos Park, Tinley Park, and Worth and includes parts of the Chicago neighborhoods of Auburn Gresham, Beverly, Morgan Park, Mount Greenwood, and Washington Heights. The district has been represented by Democrat Frances Ann Hurley since January 9, 2013. Herb Hebein, former Chicago police officer, was the Republican challenger in this election.

District 36
The 36th district, located in the Chicago area, includes parts of Chicago Ridge, Evergreen Park, Oak Lawn, Palos Heights, Palos Park, Willow Springs, and Worth and includes parts of the Chicago neighborhoods of Ashburn, Auburn Gresham, Beverly, and Mount Greenwood. The district has been represented by Democrat Kelly M. Burke since January 12, 2011. Burke faced neither any challengers in her primary nor any Republican challenger in the general election.

District 37
The 37th district, located in the Chicago area, includes parts of Frankfort, Frankfort Square, Homer Glen, Joliet, Lockport, Mokena, New Lenox, Orland Park, and Tinley Park. The district has been represented by Republican Margo McDermed since January 14, 2015. McDermed faced a Democratic challenger in the general election from Matthew Hunt, property and casualty insurance agent for his family's agency, Hunt Insurance Group, Board Member of the Illinois State Fire Marshall Elevator Safety Division, and Trustee of the Palos Heights Police Pension Board.

District 38
The 38th district, located in the Chicago area, includes parts of Country Club Hills, Flossmoor, Frankfort, Frankfort Square, Harvey, Hazel Crest, Homewood, Markham, Matteson, Oak Forest, Olympia Fields, Park Forest, Richton Park, Tinley Park, and University Park. The district had been represented by Democrat Al Riley since January 10, 2007. On September 26, 2017, Riley announced he would not seek reelection to a seventh term. The Democratic primary for the 38th district featured four candidates:
David Bonner, former legal officer and administrative law attorney in the Department of the Army's Office of The Inspector General, at The Pentagon, former Illinois Assistant Attorney General in the Civil Trials and Prosecutions unit, and formerly worked on Barack Obama's Senate campaign.
Cecil Matthews Jr., finance supervisor for Winston & Strawn LLP, first-time candidate
Debbie Meyers-Martin, former village president and trustee of Olympia Fields, president of the South Suburban Mayors and Managers Association, and former member of several advisory boards, economic boards, and regulatory boards.
Max Solomon, attorney, adjunct professor at South Suburban College, and former primary candidate for the 19th district in the Illinois Senate.

After winning her primary, Meyers-Martin would face no Republican challenger in the general election.

District 39
The 39th district includes parts of the Chicago neighborhoods of Avondale, Belmont Cragin, Dunning, Hermosa, Irving Park, Logan Square, and Portage Park. The district has been represented by Democrat Will Guzzardi since January 14, 2015. Guzzardi faced neither any challengers in his primary nor any Republican challenger in the general election.

District 40
The 40th district includes parts of the Chicago neighborhoods of Albany Park, Avondale, Irving Park, Logan Square, and Portage Park. The district has been represented by Democrat Jaime Andrade Jr. since his appointment in August 2013. Andrade Jr. faced neither any challengers in his primary nor any Republican challenger in the general election.

District 41
The 41st district, located in the Chicago area, includes parts of Bolingbrook, Naperville, and Warrenville. The district has been represented by Republican Grant Wehrli since January 14, 2015. Val Montgomery was the democratic challenger in this election. Montgomery would later be found to be incorrectly listed by the DuPage County Election Commission as living in the 41st district, whereas her address placed her in the 49th district. DuPage County Judge Bonnie Wheaton as a result ruled that Montgomery could not be a candidate in the election and if elected could only be seated if she wins and the Illinois General Assembly decided to seat her. Despite this ruling, Montgomery did not withdraw from the race and remained on the ballot.

District 42
The 42nd district, located in the Chicago area, includes all or parts of Carol Stream, Lisle, Naperville, Warrenville, West Chicago, Wheaton, and Winfield. The district had been represented by Republican Jeanne Ives since January 9, 2013. Ives announced in October 2017 her intention to run for Governor and would not run for reelection to her seat. The Republican primary for the 42nd district seat featured three candidates.
Ryan Edward Byrne, Director of Marketing for Cunningham Trading Systems, LLC and BS in Mechanical Engineering from Washington University in St. Louis.
Amy Grant, former school teacher of Pittsburgh Public Schools, DuPage County Board member since her election in 2012, and a Milton Township Republican Committeewoman since 2006.
Burt Minor, former member of the Wheaton Chamber of Commerce, former alderman of Warrenville, Illinois, and a retired USAF Officer Lieutenant Colonel.
Burt Minor would face controversy after the leak of a conversation he had with Republican candidate for Illinois Attorney General Erika Harold. The conversation involved Burt Minor asking Erika Harold about her marriage status, asking if she was a "lesbo" and frequent use of the n-word in front of her and her assistant, asking whether Erika Harold found it offensive.

Kathleen Carrier, family caregiver, precinct committeeman since 2003, and former chair of the Wayne Township Democratic Party was the sole Democratic nominee for the 42nd district.

District 43
The 43rd district, located in the Chicago area, includes parts of Barrington Hills, Carpentersville, East Dundee, Elgin, Hoffman Estates, and South Elgin. The district has been represented by Democrat Anna Moeller since her appointment in March 2014. Moeller faced a Republican challenger in the general election from Andrew Cuming, property management company owner, member of the Citizen's Police Academy Alumni Association, and President of the Elgin Southwest Area Neighbors.

District 44
The 44th district, located in the Chicago area, includes all or parts of Bartlett, Elgin, Hanover Park, Hoffman Estates, Schaumburg, and Streamwood. The district has been represented by Democrat Fred Crespo since January 10, 2007. Crespo faced a Republican challenger in the general election from Katy Dolan Baumer, business owner, worked as President of the Streamwood Chamber of Commerce, and clerk to the Hanover Township.

District 45
The 45th district, located in the Chicago area, includes all or parts of Addison, Bartlett, Bloomingdale, Carol Stream, Elk Grove Village, Hanover Park, Itasca, Roselle, Streamwood, Wayne, West Chicago, and Wood Dale. The district had been represented by Republican Christine Winger since January 14, 2015. Prior to the primary election, the Democratic nominee for the district was Cynthia Borbas, IT consultant, formerly volunteered at the Carol Stream Chamber of Commerce, and formerly volunteered at the Northern Illinois Food Bank. At some unknown time, Borbas would withdraw from the race. Diane Pappas, attorney specializing in corporate counsel, former President of the Friends of the Itasca Community Library, and a Democratic Precinct Committeeman of Addison Township Precinct 23 would become the Democratic candidate for the general election.

District 46
The 46th district, located in the Chicago area, includes all or parts of Addison, Bloomingdale, Carol Stream, Elmhurst, Glen Ellyn, Glendale Heights, Hanover Park, Lombard, Oakbrook Terrace, Villa Park, and Wheaton. The district has been represented by Democrat Deb Conroy since January 9, 2013. The Republican primary saw two candidates seek the nomination for the general election. Gordon "Jay" Kinzler, doctor and surgeon, member of the Glen Ellyn Park District Board, and former commissioner of the Environmental Commission of the Village of Glen Ellyn. Roger Orozco, police detective and former school board member of Community Consolidated School District 93.

District 47
The 47th district, located in the Chicago area, includes all or parts of Burr Ridge, Clarendon Hills, Darien, Downers Grove, Elmhurst, Hinsdale, Lombard, Oak Brook, Oakbrook Terrace, Villa Park, Western Springs, Westmont, and Willowbrook. The district had been represented by Republican Patti Bellock since January 13, 1999. She had been the Deputy House Minority Leader since October 2013. On August 1, 2017, Bellock announced her intention to retire at the end of her term. Deanne Mazzochi, lawyer, business owner, and former chairman of the College of DuPage Board of Trustees, was the Republican nominee for this election. The Democratic primary featured two candidates. Jim Caffrey, former customer team manager for Clorox, a Democratic Precinct Committeeman, and served in the Peace Corps for 2 years. Anne Sommerkamp, prenatal educator, former journalist from 1980 to 1999, and former candidate for Downers Grove Township Clerk in 2017. Caffrey would go on to win the primary election and become the Democratic nominee. Patti Bellock would resign from her State Representative seat to serve as Illinois Department of Healthcare and Family Services Director. Candidate Mazzochi would then be appointed on July 16, 2018 to fill the vacancy.

District 48
The 48th district, located in the Chicago area, includes parts of Downers Grove, Glen Ellyn, Lisle, Lombard, Oakbrook Terrace, Villa Park, and Wheaton. The district had been represented by Republican Peter Breen since January 14, 2015. The Democratic candidate for this election was Terra Costa Howard, lawyer, former member of the Glen Ellyn School District 41 Board of Education, and adjunct professor at College of DuPage.

District 49
The 49th district, located in the Chicago area, includes parts of Aurora, Bartlett, Batavia, Elgin, Geneva, Naperville, North Aurora, South Elgin, St. Charles, Warrenville, Wayne, and West Chicago. The district had been represented by Republican Mike Fortner since January 10, 2007. Fortner announced August 7, 2017 that he would not seek reelection. The Democratic nominee, and winner of the general election, was Karina Villa. Villa was a school social worker, member of the West Chicago District 33 Board of Education since 2013, and vice president of the West Chicago 33 Board of Education. The Republican candidate was Tonia Jane Khouri, business owner, DuPage County board member, and chair of the DuPage County Economic Development Committee. She won the Republican primary against Nic Zito.

District 50
The 50th district, located in the Chicago area, includes all or parts of Aurora, Batavia, Big Rock, Campton Hills, Elburn, Geneva, Lily Lake, Montgomery, North Aurora, Oswego, Plano, Prestbury, St. Charles, Sugar Grove, and Yorkville. The district has been represented by Republican Keith R. Wheeler since January 14, 2015. The Democratic candidate for this election was James Leslie, firefighter/paramedic, former executive of the Naperville IAFF L4302, and first-time candidate.

Districts 51–75

District 51
The 51st district, located in the Chicago area, includes all or parts of Arlington Heights, Barrington, Barrington Hills, Buffalo Grove, Deer Park, Forest Lake, Grayslake, Green Oaks, Gurnee, Hawthorn Woods, Kildeer, Lake Barrington, Lake Zurich, Libertyville, Long Grove, Mettawa, Mundelein, North Barrington, Tower Lakes, Vernon Hills, Wauconda, and Waukegan. The district had been represented by Republican Nick Sauer since December 2016. Nick Sauer was slated to be the Republican nominee for the general election. On August 1, 2018, Politico reported on Sauer allegedly using his ex-girlfriend's nude photos to catfish for seeking online relationships with men. Sauer would then resign at 5 pm on the same day. Helene Walsh, wife of former US representative Joe Walsh, was appointed to Sauer's seat on August 18, 2018.

Mary Edly-Allen, bilingual teacher, co-founder of Foundation 46, and board member of the Illinois Science Olympiad was the Democratic candidate for the general election.

District 52
The 52nd district, located in the Chicago area, includes all or parts of Algonquin, Barrington, Barrington Hills, Carpentersville, Cary, Crystal Lake, East Dundee, Fox River Grove, Hoffman Estates, Inverness, Island Lake, Lake Barrington, Lake in the Hills, North Barrington, Oakwood Hills, Port Barrington, Prairie Grove, South Barrington, Tower Lakes, Trout Valley, and Wauconda. The district has been represented by Republican David McSweeney since January 9, 2013. McSweeney faced neither any challengers in his primary nor any Democratic challengers in the general election.

District 53
The 53rd district, located in the Chicago area, includes parts of Arlington Heights, Buffalo Grove, Des Plaines, Elk Grove Village, Mount Prospect, Prospect Heights, and Wheeling. The district had been represented by Republican David Harris since January 12, 2011, previously serving the Illinois State House from January 12, 1983 to January 13, 1993. Harris announced on October 4, 2017 that he would be retiring from the Illinois House, citing his frustrations with the Illinois Budget Impasse as he was one of the few Republicans who voted to overturn Governor Bruce Rauner's veto. The Republican primary featured two candidates. Eddie Corrigan, outreach coordinator and cancer research and awareness advocate. Katie Miller, registered nurse, religious education teacher, and a former basketball coach. Corrigan would become the Republican nominee. The Democratic nominee for this election was Mark Walker, experienced in business and entrepreneurship for 35 years, treasurer of the Journeys organization, and member of the Arlington Heights Park Foundation Board. He previously served as State Representative from 2009–2011 in the 66th district.

District 54
The 54th district, located in the Chicago area, includes parts of Arlington Heights, Barrington, Deer Park, Hoffman Estates, Inverness, Palatine, Rolling Meadows, Schaumburg, and South Barrington. The district has been represented by Republican Tom Morrison since January 12, 2011. The Democratic candidate for this election was Maggie Trevor, principal, owner of Trevor Research Services, LLC, and member of the City of Rolling Meadows Environmental Committee since 2015.

District 55
The 55th district, located in the Chicago area, includes parts of Arlington Heights, Des Plaines, Elk Grove Village, Mount Prospect, Park Ridge, Rolling Meadows, and Schaumburg as well as parts of the Chicago neighborhood of O'Hare. The district has been represented by Democrat Marty Moylan since January 9, 2013. The Republican challenger for this election was Marilyn Smolenski, business owner, volunteer for USO and Special Olympics, and was involved with the Boy Scouts of America for many years.

District 56
The 56th district, located in the Chicago area, includes parts of Elk Grove Village, Hanover Park, Hoffman Estates, Palatine, Rolling Meadows, Roselle, and Schaumburg. The district has been represented by Democrat Michelle Mussman since January 12, 2011. The Republican primary for this election featured two candidates. Jillian Rose Bernas, international relations manager, a Schaumburg Township District Library Trustee, and Township of Schaumburg Mental Health Committee Member. Char Kegarise, branch officer manager and member of the Schaumburg District 54 School Board. Bernas would go on to become the Republican nominee for the general election.

District 57
The 57th district, located in the Chicago area, includes parts of Arlington Heights, Buffalo Grove, Des Plaines, Glenview, Mount Prospect, Northbrook, Palatine, Prospect Heights, and Wheeling. The district had been represented by Democrat Elaine Nekritz since January 8, 2003. Nekritz announced she was planning to resign in June 2017. Her official resignation became effective October 2, 2017. Jonathan Carroll was appointed to Nekritz's seat on October 4, 2017. Mary Battinus was the Republican challenger in this election. On May 29, 2018, Battinus withdrew from the race as a result of moving out of the state.

District 58
The 58th district, located in the Chicago area, includes all or parts of Bannockburn, Deerfield, Glencoe, Highland Park, Highwood, Knollwood, Lake Bluff, Lake Forest, Lincolnshire, Mettawa, North Chicago, Northbrook, and Riverwoods. The district had been represented by Democrat Scott Drury since January 9, 2013. Drury attempted to run for Governor of Illinois, but opted to run for Illinois Attorney General after the retirement of Lisa Madigan, leaving the 58th district seat open. The Democratic nominee for this election was Bob Morgan, former lead healthcare attorney for Illinois, board member of the Anti-Defamation League, and serves as a trustee for Equip for Equality. Cindy Masover was slated to be the Republican nominee for the general election until she decided to leave the race for personal reasons. Rick Lesser, small business owner and estate planning attorney, former member of the Lake Bluff Village Board of Trustees, and former president of the Lake County Bar Association, became the Republican nominee on July 26, 2018 for the general election.

District 59
The 59th district, located in the Chicago area, includes parts of Buffalo Grove, Green Oaks, Gurnee, Indian Creek, Knollwood, Lake Forest, Lincolnshire, Long Grove, Mettawa, Mundelein, North Chicago, Northbrook, Park City, Riverwoods, Vernon Hills, Waukegan, and Wheeling. The district had been represented by Democrat Carol Sente since her appointment in September 2009. Sente announced on September 12, 2017 that she would not seek reelection. The Democratic primary featured two candidates. Daniel Didech, municipal attorney and supervisor of the Vernon Township. Susan Malter, attorney, founding member of the Chicago Legal Responders Network, and an active member of the Lawyers for Good Government (L4GG). Didech would go on to become the Democratic nominee for the general election. The Republican primary featured two candidates. Karen Feldman, residential realtor and Village Trustee of Lincolnshire from 2001–2018. Marko Sukovic, business owner, former political director for Congressman Robert Dold, and outreach director for Turning Point USA. Feldman would go on to become the Republican nominee for the general election.

District 60
The 60th district, located in the Chicago area, includes parts of Beach Park, Gurnee, North Chicago, Park City, and Waukegan. The district has been represented by Democrat Rita Mayfield since her appointment in July 2010. Mayfield faced neither any challengers in her primary nor any Republican challenger in the general election.

District 61
The 61st district, located in the Chicago area, includes parts of Antioch, Beach Park, Gages Lake, Grandwood Park, Gurnee, Lake Villa, Lindenhurst, Old Mill Creek, Third Lake, Wadsworth, Waukegan, Winthrop Harbor, and Zion. The district had been represented by Republican Sheri Jesiel since her appointment on July 2, 2014. The Democratic nominee this election was Joyce Mason, human resources consultant, vice president of the board of education for the Woodland Consolidated Community School District 50, and a member of the board of directors for A Safe Place, a domestic violence organization.

District 62
The 62nd district, located in the Chicago area, includes all or parts of Gages Lake, Grayslake, Gurnee, Hainesville, Lake Villa, Long Lake, Round Lake, Round Lake Beach, Round Lake Heights, Round Lake Park, Third Lake, Venetian Village, Volo, Wauconda, and Waukegan. The district has been represented by Democrat Sam Yingling since January 9, 2013. The Republican primary featured two candidates. Ken Idstein, mortgage banker, member of the Grayslake Chamber of Commerce, and member of the Grayslake Planning and Zoning Commission. Adam Solano, financial advisor, former president of National Association of Insurance and Financial Advisors (NAIFA) in Illinois, and former president of NAIFA Chicago. Idstein would go on to become the Republican nominee.

District 63
The 63rd district, located in the Chicago area, includes all or parts of Bull Valley, Chemung, Crystal Lake, Greenwood, Harvard, Hebron, Johnsburg, Lakemoor, Marengo, McCullom Lake, McHenry, Pistakee Highlands, Richmond, Ringwood, Spring Grove, Union, Wonder Lake, and Woodstock. The district has been represented by Republican Steve Reick since January 11, 2017. Reick faced neither any challengers in his primary nor any Democratic challenger in the general election.

District 64
The 64th district, located in the Chicago area, includes all or parts of Antioch, Bull Valley, Channel Lake, Crystal Lake, Fox Lake, Fox Lake Hills, Holiday Hills, Island Lake, Johnsburg, Lake Catherine, Lake Villa, Lakemoor, Lakewood, Lindenhurst, Long Lake, McHenry, Prairie Grove, Round Lake Heights, Spring Grove, Venetian Village, Volo, Wauconda, Wonder Lake, and Woodstock. The district had been represented by Republican Barbara Wheeler since January 9, 2013. Wheeler announced on July 28, 2017 that she would not seek reelection in 2018. The Republican nominee this election was Tom Weber, small business owner, member of the Lake County Board since 2012, and member of the Lake County Forest Preserve District Board. The Democratic nominee for this election was Trisha Zubert, works in finance, a school board member and president, and a volunteer with Lake County Haven.

District 65
The 65th district, located in the Chicago area, includes all or parts of Batavia, Burlington, Campton Hills, Elgin, Geneva, Gilberts, Hampshire, Huntley, Pingree Grove, South Elgin, St. Charles, and Wayne. The district had been represented by Republican Steven Andersson since January 14, 2015. Andersson announced on August 16, 2017 he would not seek reelection to the Illinois House of Representatives in 2018 during an appearance on Chicago Tonight. Andersson was one of the few Republicans during the Illinois Budget Impasse to vote to overturn Governor Bruce Rauner's veto. The Republican nominee for this election was Dan Ugaste, attorney, former member of the Illinois Workers Compensation Medical Fee Advisory Board, and the Technical Advisor to Governor's Office on Workers Comp Reform. The Democratic nominee for this election was Richard Johnson, law and psychology teacher at Bartlett High School and President of the Elgin Teachers Association.

District 66
The 66th district, located in the Chicago area, includes all or parts of Algonquin, Carpetnersville, Crystal Lake, East Dundee, Elgin, Gilberts, Huntley, Lake in the Hills, Lakewood, Sleepy Hollow, and West Dundee. The district has been represented by Republican Allen Skillicorn since January 11, 2017. Skillicorn faced neither any challengers in his primary nor any Democratic challenger in the general election.

District 67
The 67th district covers a large part of Rockford. The district had been represented by Democrat Litesa Wallace since her appointment in July 2014. Wallace would become Daniel Biss' running mate for seeking the Democratic nomination in the gubernatorial election, leaving her seat open. The Democratic primary for this election featured four candidates.
Gerald O. Albert, self-employed, former candidate for several town, township, and county positions, and involved in several campaigns for elected officials in Rockford.
Valerie DeCastris, community volunteer activist, worked as a research associate for the Illinois General Assembly, and founder of the Rockford Ethnic Village Neighborhood Association.
Angela Fellars
Maurice West, director of career development at Rockford University and member of the Community Action Agency Board in Rockford since 2013.
After winning the Democratic nomination, West would face no Republican challenger in the general election.

District 68
The 68th district covers parts of Cherry Valley, Loves Park, Machesney Park, Rockford, and Roscoe. The district has been represented by Republican John Cabello since his appointment in August 2012. The Democratic nominee for this election was Jake Castanza, the executive director of Project First Rate.

District 69
The 69th district covers all or parts of Belvidere, Caledonia, Capron, Cherry Valley, Loves Park, New Milford, Poplar Grove, Rockford, Rockton, Roscoe, South Beloit, and Timberlane. The district has been represented by Republican Joe Sosnowski since January 12, 2011. The Democratic nominee for this election was Angie Bodine, driver for First Student and Precinct Committee Person Secretary of Boone County Democrats.

District 70
The 70th district, located partly in the Chicago area, includes Belvidere, Big Rock, Burlington, Campton Hills, Cortland, DeKalb, Elgin, Garden Prairie, Genoa, Hampshire, Hinckley, Kaneville, Kingston, Kirkland, Lily Lake, Malta, Maple Park, Poplar Grove, Sugar Grove, Sycamore, and Virgil. The district had been represented by Republican Bob Pritchard since his appointment in December 2003. Pritchard announced that he would be retiring at the end of his term. He was one of the few Republicans who voted to end the Illinois Budget Impasse. The Republican nominee for this election was Jeff Keicher, small business owner. The Democratic primary featured two candidates. Howard Solomon, retiree, member and secretary of the District 428 Board of Education, and former member of the Village of Fox Lake Planning Commission. Paul Stoddard, retired Associate Professor of Geology at Northern Illinois University and member of the DeKalb County board. Stoddard would go on to become the Democratic nominee for the general election. Republican candidate Keicher would later be appointed to the seat in July 2018 to finish the remainder of Pritchard's term.

District 71
The 71st district, located partly in the Quad Cities area, covers all or parts of Albany, Carbon Cliff, Cleveland, Coal Valley, Colona, Como, Cordova, Deer Grove, East Moline, Erie, Fulton, Hampton, Hillsdale, Lyndon, Moline, Morrison, Port Byron, Prophetstown, Rapids City, Rock Falls, Savanna, Silvis, Sterling, Tampico, and Thomson. The district has been represented by Republican Tony McCombie since January 11, 2017. The Democratic nominee for this election was Joan Padilla, executive director of Home of Hope Cancer Wellness Center, former Sauk Valley Community College Trustee, and a member of the Sauk Valley Community College Foundation.

District 72
The 72nd district, located in the Quad Cities area, covers all or parts of Andalusia, Coyne Center, Milan, Moline, Oak Grove, Reynolds, Rock Island, and Rock Island Arsenal. The district has been represented by Democrat Michael Halpin since January 10, 2017. The Republican nominee for this election was Glen Evans Sr., former state house primary candidate for the Democratic Party in 2012 and 2016 and former candidate for multiple county and municipal positions.

District 73
The 73rd district, located in the Peoria metropolitan area, covers all or parts of Bay View Gardens, Bradford, Brimfield, Buda, Chillicothe, Dana, Dunlap, Elmwood, Germantown Hills, Henry, Hopewell, La Fayette, La Rose, Lacon, Leonore, Lostant, Metamora, Neponset, Peoria, Peoria Heights, Princeville, Roanoke, Rome, Rutland, Sparland, Spring Bay, Tiskilwa, Toluca, Toulon, Varna, Washburn, Wenona, Wyanet, and Wyoming. The district has been represented by Republican Ryan Spain since January 11, 2017. Spain faced neither any challengers in his primary nor any Democratic challenger in the general election.

District 74
The 74th district covers all or parts of Aledo, Alexis, Alpha, Altona, Amboy, Andover, Annawan, Atkinson, Bishop Hill, Buda, Cambridge, Dover, East Galesburg, Galesburg, Galva, Geneseo, Gilson, Harmon, Henderson, Hooppole, Joy, Keithsburg, Kewanee, Knoxville, La Moille, London Mills, Manlius, Maquon, Matherville, Mineral, New Bedford, New Boston, North Henderson, Oak Run, Ohio, Oneida, Orion, Rio, Seaton, Sheffield, Sherrard, Sublette, Victoria, Viola, Walnut, Wataga, Williamsfield, Windsor, Woodhull, and Yates City. The district has been represented by Republican Daniel Swanson since January 11, 2017. Swanson faced neither any challengers in his primary nor any Democratic challenger in the general election.

District 75
The 75th district, located in parts of the Chicago area, includes all or parts of Braceville, Braidwood, Carbon Hill, Channahon, Coal City, Diamond, Dwight, Godley, Joliet, Kinsman, Lake Holiday, Lakewood Shores, Lisbon, Marseilles, Mazon, Millbrook, Millington, Minooka, Morris, Newark, Oswego, Plano, Plattville, Ransom, Sandwich, Seneca, Sheridan, Verona, Wilmington, and Yorkville. The district has been represented by Republican David Welter since his appointment in July 2016. Welter faced neither any challengers in his primary nor any Democratic challenger in the general election.

Districts 76–100

District 76
The 76th district covers all or parts of Arlington, Bureau Junction, Cedar Point, Cherry, Dalzell, Dayton, De Pue, Dover, Grand Ridge, Granville, Hennepin, Hollowayville, Kangley, LaSalle, Ladd, Magnolia, Malden, Mark, Marseilles, McNabb, Naplate, North Utica, Oglesby, Ottawa, Peru, Seatonville, Spring Valley, Standard, Streator, Tonica, and Troy Grove. The district had been represented by Republican Jerry Lee Long since January 11, 2017. The Democratic primary featured two candidates. Jill Bernal, registered nurse, member of the La Salle County Board for the 8th district, and member of the Peru School Board. Lance Yednock, business agent with Operating Engineers Local 150 and first-time candidate. Yednock would go on to become the Democratic nominee for the general election.

District 77
The 77th district, located in the Chicago area, includes all or parts of Addison, Bellwood, Bensenville, Berkeley, Des Plaines, Elk Grove Village, Elmhurst, Franklink Park, Maywood, Melrose Park, Northlake, Rosemont, Stone Park, Villa Park, and Wood Dale as well parts of the Chicago neighborhood of O'Hare. The district has been represented by Democrat Kathleen Willis since January 9, 2013. The Republican nominee for this election was Anthony Airdo, sales director, former Republican candidate in the 2016 election, and a church volunteer.

District 78
The 78th district, located in the Chicago area, includes parts of Elmwood Park, Franklin Park, Melrose Park, Oak Park, and River Grove and includes parts of the Chicago neighborhood of Austin. The district has been represented by Democrat Camille Lilly since her appointment in April 2010. Lilly faced neither any challengers in her primary nor any Republican challenger in the general election.

District 79
The 79th district, located mostly in the Chicago area, includes all or parts of Aroma Park, Beecher, Bonfield, Bourbonnais, Braceville, Bradley, Buckingham, Cabery, Chebanse, Coal City, East Brooklyn, Essex, Gardner, Godley, Herscher, Hopkins Park, Irwin, Kankakee, Limestone, Momence, Peotone, Reddick, Sammons Point, South Wilmington, St. Anne, Sun River Terrace, and Union Hill. The district has been represented by Republican Lindsay Parkhurst since January 11, 2017. The Democratic nominee for this election was former State Representative Lisa M. Dugan of the district from December 2003 to January 9, 2013. The race, dubbed a "battle royal" by the Daily Journal, is expected to cost in the millions of dollars.

District 80
The 80th district, located in the Chicago area, includes all or parts of Chicago Heights, Flossmoor, Frankfort, Glenwood, Hazel Crest, Homewood, Joliet, Manhattan, Matteson, Mokena, Monee, New Lenox, Olympia Fields, Park Forest, Richton Park, South Chicago Heights, Steger, Symerton, University Park, and Wilmington. The district has been represented by Democrat Anthony DeLuca since his appointment in March 2009. DeLuca faced neither any challengers in his primary nor any Republican challenger in the general election.

District 81
The 81st district, located in the Chicago area, includes parts of Bolingbrook, Darien, Downers Grove, Lisle, Naperville, Westmont, and Woodridge. The district had been represented by Republican David S. Olsen since his appointment on August 3, 2016. The Democratic nominee for this election was Anne Stava-Murray, former consumer researcher, member of the Naperville Board of Fire & Police, and a former student non-voting member of the Naperville Board of Zoning Appeals from 2002–2004.

District 82
The 82nd district, located in the Chicago area, covers parts of Burr Ridge, Countryside, Darien, Hinsdale, Homer Glen, Indian Head Park, La Grange, Lemont, Lockport, Palos Park, Western Springs, Willow Springs, Willowbrook, and Woodridge. The district has been represented by Republican Leader Jim Durkin since his January 2006 appointment. He previously served in the Illinois House from January 1995 to January 2003.

Durkin is being challenged by Burr Ridge Mayor Mickey Straub. Straub is being backed by radio host and political operative Dan Proft. While Michael Madigan was challenged by Jason Gonzalez in 2016, it is rare that one of the "four tops" is challenged, let alone in a primary election. On October 26, 2017, Durkin was endorsed by a number of Republican mayors from DuPage County. Durkin would go on to become the Republican nominee for the general election.

Republican Primary Endorsements

The Democratic nominee for this election was Tom Chlystek, Alderman for the City of Darien in Ward 4.

District 83
The 83rd district, located in the Chicago area, includes parts of Aurora, Montgomery, and North Aurora. The district has been represented by Democrat Linda Chapa LaVia since January 8, 2003. LaVia faced neither any challengers in her primary nor any Republican challenger in the general election.

District 84
The 84th district, located in the Chicago area, covers parts of Aurora, Boulder Hill, Montgomery, Naperville, and Oswego. The district has been represented by Democrat Stephanie Kifowit since January 9, 2013. The Republican nominee for this election was Patty Smith, an ABA certified paralegal at Prairie State Legal Services, chairwoman of the Western Suburb National Association for Down Syndrome, and board member and parent advocate for Gigi's Playhouse Fox Valley.

District 85
The 85th district, located in the Chicago area, covers parts of Bolingbrook, Crest Hill, Fairmont, Lemont, Lockport, Naperville, Romeoville, and Woodridge. The district had been represented by Democrat Emily McAsey since January 14, 2009. McAsey resigned from her seat on June 2, 2017 to, according to the Daily Southtown, "join her husband who accepted a job out of state." John Connor, a prosecutor for Will County for 14 years, was named to fill the seat in June 2017. The Republican nominee for this election was originally slated to be Lisa Bickus, but she would later withdraw from the race at an unknown date.

District 86
The 86th district, located in the Chicago area, covers all or parts of Channahon, Crest Hill, Elmwood, Ingalls Park, Joliet, New Lenox, Preston Heights, Rockdale, and Shorewood. The district has been represented by Democrat Larry Walsh Jr. since his appointment in April 2012. The Republican nominee for this election was Rick Laib, sergeant of the Will County Sheriff's Office, formerly a part of the United States Army Reserve, and in his police work is assigned as an Honor Guard and a member of the SWAT team.

District 87
The 87th district, located within the Springfield metropolitan area, includes all or parts of Armington, Athens, Atlanta, Beason, Broadwell, Buffalo, Cantrall, Chestnut, Clear Lake, Cornland, Dawson, Delavan, Elkhart, Emden, Grandview, Green Valley, Greenview, Hartsburg, Hopedale, Illiopolis, Lake Petersburg, Latham, Lincoln, Mechanicsburg, Middletown, Minier, Morton, Mount Pulaski, New Holland, Oakford, Pekin, Petersburg, Riverton, Rochester, San Jose, Sherman, Spaulding, Springfield, Tallula, Tremon, and Williamsville. The district has been represented by Republican Tim Butler since his appointment in March 2015. Butler faced neither any challengers in his primary nor any Democratic challengers in the general election.

District 88
The 88th district, located in parts of the Peoria metropolitan area and Bloomington–Normal area, covers all or parts of Bloomington, Danvers, Deer Creek, East Peoria, Goodfield, Heritage Lake, Mackinaw, McLean, Morton, Normal, Pekin, Stanford, Twin Grove, and Washington. The district has been represented by Republican Keith P. Sommer since January 13, 1999. The Democratic nominee for this election was Jill Blair, communications analyst for Country Financial, former dean of adult education at Heartland Community College, and former full-time coordinator of the ESL program at the college.

District 89
The 89th district covers all or parts of Adeline, Apple Canyon Lake, Apple River, Cedarville, Chadwick, Coleta, Dakota, Davis, Durand, East Dubuque, Elizabeth, Forreston, Freeport, Galena, The Galena Territory, German Valley, Hanover, Lake Summerset, Lanark, Leaf River, Lena, Menominee, Milledgeville, Mount Carroll, Mount Morris, Nora, Orangeville, Pearl City, Pecatonica, Ridott, Rock City, Rockford, Scales Mound, Shannon, Stockton, Warren, Winnebago, and Winslow. The district had been represented by Republican Brian W. Stewart since his appointment in October 2013. Stewart announced on September 6, 2017 that he would be running for the seat of retiring State Senator Tim Bivins, leaving his own seat open. The Republican primary featured two candidates. Andrew Chesney, small business owner and licensed real estate agent, chairman of the Stephenson County Republican Party, and an alderman of Freeport. Steve Fricke, owner/operator of Triple Creek Farms, member of the Stephenson County board, and member of the Stephenson County Farmland Assessment Committee. Chesney would go on to become the Republican nominee for the general election. The Democratic nominee for this election was Nick Hyde, attorney, formerly worked for Senator Dick Durbin, and former volunteer for the Legislative Technical Review Office in the Illinois General Assembly. After winning the election, Chesney would be appointed to the seat for the 100th General Assembly on December 5, 2018.

District 90
The 90th district covers all or parts of Amboy, Ashton, Byron, Compton, Creston, Davis Junction, DeKalb, Dixon, Earlville, Franklin Grove, Grand Detour, Hillcrest, Lake Holiday, Lee, Leland, Lost Nation, Malta, Mendota, Monroe Center, Nelson, Oregon, Paw Paw, Polo, Rochelle, Sandwich, Shabbona, Somonauk, Steward, Stillman Valley, Sublette, Waterman, and West Brooklyn. The district has been represented by Republican Tom Demmer since January 9, 2013. The Democratic nominee for this election was Amy Davis, a retired educator and involved in the Action for a Better Tomorrow organization.

District 91
The 91st district, located in the Peoria metropolitan area, includes all or parts of Banner, Bartonville, Bryant, Canton, Creve Coeur, Cuba, Dunfermline, East Peoria, Fairview, Farmington, Glasford, Hanna City, Kingston Mines, Lake Camelot, Lewistown, Liverpool, Mapleton, Marquette Heights, Morton, Norris, North Pekin, Norwood, Pekin, South Pekin, and St. David. The district has been represented by Republican Mike Unes since January 12, 2011. He was an Assistant Republican Leader in the Illinois House during the 100th General Assembly. According to Illinois Election Data, the 91st district was the 4th most Democratic district represented by a Republican during the election. The Democratic challenger in this election was Carolyn Blodgett, a member of the Fulton County Board, caseworker for the Lewistown Department of Human Services, and AFSCME union steward.

District 92
The 92nd district, located at the heart of the Peoria metropolitan area, covers all or parts of Bartonville, Bellevue, Peoria, Peoria Heights, and West Peoria. The district has been represented by Democrat Jehan Gordon-Booth since January 14, 2009. She was an Assistant Majority Leader of the Illinois House from 2015–2019. She faced neither any challengers in her primary nor any Republican challengers in the general election.

District 93
The 93rd district represents all or parts of Abingdon, Adair, Alexis, Arenzville, Ashland, Astoria, Avon, Bardolph, Bath, Beardstown, Blandinsville, Browning, Bushnell, Camden, Chandlerville, Colchester, Easton, Ellisville, Forest City, Galesburg, Georgetown, Good Hope, Goofy Ridge, Havana, Industry, Ipava, Kilbourne, Littleton, London Mills, Macomb, Manito, Marietta, Mason City, Mound Station, Mount Sterling, Plymouth, Prairie City, Ripley, Rushville, San Jose, Sciota, Smithfield, St. Augustine, Table Grove, Tennessee, Topeka, Vermont, Versailles, and Virginia. The district has been represented by Republican Norine Hammond since her appointment in December 2010. As a result of Hammond's yea votes to overturn Governor Rauner's vetoes during the Illinois Budget Impasse, she would face a Republican challenger from Joshua Griffith, first-time candidate and manager of a roofing company in Galesburg. After winning her primary, Hammond would face Democratic challenger John Curtis, owner of Barefoot Gardens CSA and public school teacher, in the general election.

District 94
The 94th district represents all or parts of Augusta, Basco, Bentley, Biggsville, Bowen, Camp Point, Carthage, Clayton, Coatsburg, Columbus, Dallas City, Elvaston, Ferris, Gladstone, Golden, Gulf Port, Hamilton, Kirkwood, La Harpe, La Prairie, Liberty, Lima, Little York, Lomax, Loraine, Media, Mendon, Monmouth, Nauvoo, Oquawka, Payson, Plainville, Plymouth, Pontoosuc, Quincy, Raritan, Roseville, Stronghurst, Ursa, Warsaw, and West Point. The district has been represented by Republican Randy Frese since January 14, 2015. Democrat Richard Cramsey, former 30 year pharmaceutical employee and farmer, would enter the race to challenge Frese after the primary election.

District 95
The 95th district includes all or parts of Assumption, Benld, Brighton, Bunker Hill, Butler, Carlinville, Coalton, Coffeen, Donnellson, Dorchester, Eagarville, East Gillespie, Farmersville, Fillmore, Gillespie, Girard, Harvel, Hillsboro, Holiday Shores, Irving, Lake Ka-Ho, Litchfield, Livingston, Medora, Morrisonville, Mount Clare, Mount Olive, Moweaqua, New Douglas, Nilwood, Nokomis, Ohlman, Owaneco, Palmer, Pana, Panama, Raymond, Royal Lakes, Sawyerville, Schram City, Shipman, Standard City, Staunton, Stonington, Taylor Springs, Taylorville, Virden, Waggoner, Walshville, Wenonah, White City, Williamson, Witt, and Worden. The district has been represented by Republican Avery Bourne since her appointment in February 2015. Bourne faced a Democratic challenger from Dillon Clark, a Montgomery County Board Member and a compliance officer at the Litchfield National Bank.

District 96
The 96th district, located in the Springfield metropolitan area, includes all or parts of Blue Mound, Boody, Bulpitt, Decatur, Edinburg, Harristown, Jeisyville, Kincaid, Mount Auburn, Niantic, Rochester, Springfield, Stonington, Taylorville, and Tovey. The district has been represented by Democrat Sue Scherer since January 9, 2013. The Republican challenger in this election was Herman Senor, alderman for Springfield's Ward 2 and over 25 years as an employee of the Illinois Department of Transportation.

District 97
The 97th district, located in the Chicago area, includes parts of Aurora, Bolingbrook, Boulder Hill, Channahon, Joliet, Montgomery, Naperville, Oswego, Plainfield, Romeoville, and Shorewood. The district has been represented by Republican Mark Batinick since January 14, 2015. The Democratic challenger in this election was Mica Freeman, a fifth grade teacher and a ParentWISE volunteer through Anne & Robert H. Lurie Children's Hospital of Chicago.

District 98
The 98th district, located in the Chicago area, includes all or parts of Bolingbrook, Crest Hill, Crystal Lawns, Joliet, Romeoville, and Shorewood. The district has been represented by Democrat Natalie Manley since January 9, 2013. The Republican challenger in the general election was Alyssia Benford, accountant, President of the Rotary Club of Bolingbrook, and serves on the Board of Directors for the United Way of Will County.

District 99
The 99th district, located in the Springfield metropolitan area, covers all or parts of Auburn, Berlin, Chatham, Curran, Divernon, Jerome, Leland Grove, Loami, New Berlin, Pawnee, Pleasant Plains, Southern View, Springfield, Thayer, and Virden. The district had been represented by Republican Sara Wojcicki Jimenez since November 2015. Jimenez announced she would not seek reelection in 2018, leaving her seat open for other candidates. The Republican primary featured Mike Murphy, US Army and Illinois National Guard veteran, former member of the school board and village board of Divernon, and a restaurateur. Steven Westerfield, originally on the Republican primary ballot, was kicked off due to invalid signatures and filed as a write-in candidate for the primary. The Democratic challenger in this election was Marc Bell, former Illinois State Police officer for 28 years, member of the Executive Board of the NOBLE Land of Lincoln Chapter, and previously served on the board of directors for Big Brothers, Big Sisters of the Illinois Capitol Region.

District 100
The 100th district, located in parts of the Metro East, covers all or parts of Alsey, Batchtown, Baylis, Bluffs, Brighton, Brussels, Carrollton, Chapin, Chesterfield, Concord, Detroit, El Dara, Eldred, Exeter, Fidelity, Fieldon, Florence, Franklin, Glasgow, Godfrey, Grafton, Greenfield, Griggsville, Hamburg, Hardin, Hettick, Hillview, Hull, Jacksonville, Jerseyville, Kampsville, Kane, Kinderhook, Lynnville, Manchester, Meredosia, Milton, Modesto, Murrayville, Naples, Nebo, New Canton, New Salem, Otterville, Palmyra, Peal, Perry, Pittsfield, Pleasant Hill, Rockbridge, Roodhouse, Scottville, South Jacksonville, Time, Valley City, Waverly, White Hall, Wilmington, Winchester, and Woodson. The district has been represented by Republican C. D. Davidsmeyer since his appointment in December 2012. Davidsmeyer faced a primary challenge from business owner Jonas Petty. After winning his primary, Davidsmeyer would face no Democratic challenger in the general election.

Districts 101–118

District 101
The 101st district, located partly in the Bloomington-Normal area, covers all or parts of Argenta, Arrowsmith, Atwood, Bellflower, Bement, Cerro Gorod, Champaign, Cisco, Clinton, De Land, De Witt, Decatur, Downs, Ellsworth, Farmer City, Fisher, Foosland, Forsyth, Hammond, Heyworth, Ivesdale, Kenney, Lake of the Woods, LaPlace, Le Roy, Long Creek, Ludlow, Mahomet, Mansfield, Maroa, Monticello, Mount Zion, Niantic, Oreana, Saybrook, Wapella, Warrensburg, Waynesville, Weldon, and White Heath. The district had been represented by Republican Bill Mitchell since January 9, 2013, who had been serving the Illinois House of Representatives since 1999. On August 3, 2017, Mitchell announced he would not run for another term in the Illinois House. Former Decatur city councilman and Eastern Illinois University trustee Dan Caulkins ran as the Republican candidate. Jen McMillin, annual giving officer at Lincoln College, ran as the Democratic candidate.

District 102
The 102nd district covers parts of the Champaign-Urbana metropolitan area, including all or parts of Allenville, Allerton, Arcola, Arthur, Atwood, Bethany, Bondville, Broadlands, Brocton, Camargo, Champaign, Chrisman, Cowden, Fairmount, Findlay, Garrett, Gays, Herrick, Hindsboro, Homer, Hume, Ivesdale, Longview, Lovington, Macon, Metcalf, Mount Zion, Moweaqua, Newman, Oconee, Pana, Paris, Pesotum, Philo, Redmon, Sadorus, Savoy, Seymour, Shelbyville, Sidell, Sidney, Sigel, St. Joseph, Stewardson, Strasburg, Sullivan, Tolono, Tower Hill, Tuscola, Vermilion, Villa Grove, Westervelt, and Windsor. The district has been represented by Republican Brad Halbrook since January 11, 2017, previously serving the 110th district in the Illinois House of Representatives from April 2012 to January 2015. Halbrook faced neither any Republican challenger in his primary nor any Democratic challenger in the general election.

District 103
The 103rd district covers the heart of the Champaign–Urbana metropolitan area, including most of Champaign and Urbana. The district has been represented by Democrat Carol Ammons since January 14, 2015. Ammons faced neither any Democratic challenger in her primary nor any Republican challenger in the general election.

District 104
The 104th district covers parts of the Champaign-Urbana metropolitan area, including all or parts of Belgium, Catlin, Champaign, Danville, Fithian, Georgetown, Gifford, Indianola, Muncie, Oakwood, Olivet, Penfield, Rantoul, Ridge Farm, Royal, Savoy, Thomasboro, Tilton, and Westville. The district had been represented by Republican Chad Hays since December 2010. On July 7, 2017, Hays announced his retirement from the Illinois House citing the budget impasse. Vermillion County Board Chairman Mike Marron was appointed to Hays' seat on September 7, 2018 and was the Republican nominee in this election. Cindy Cunningham, who formerly directed Adult Day Care services at the Champaign County Nursing Home, was the Democratic challenger in this election.

District 105
The 105th district, located in the Bloomington-Normal area, includes all or parts of Anchor, Bloomington, Carlock, Chenoa, Colfax, Cooksville, Downs, El Paso, Fairbury, Forrest, Gridley, Hudson, Lexington, Normal, Strawn, and Towanda. The district has been represented by Republican Dan Brady since January 9, 2013, who formerly represented the 88th district from January 10, 2001 to January 9, 2013. The Democratic challenger in this election was Illinois State University Laboratory Schools' English and theater teacher Ben Webb. This is the first time since 2000 that Brady has faced a Democratic challenger.

District 106
The 106th district covers parts of the Champaign-Urbana metropolitan area, including all or parts of Alvan, Ashkum, Beaverville, Benson, Bismarck, Buckley, Cabery, Campus, Chatsworth, Chebanse, Cissna Park, Clifton, Congerville, Cornell, Crescent City, Cullom, Danforth, Deer Creek, Donovan, Dwight, El Paso, Elliott, Emington, Eureka, Flanagan, Forrest, Gibson City, Gilman, Goodfield, Henning, Hoopeston, Iroquois, Kappa, Kempton, Loda, Long Point, Martinton, Melvin, Milford, Minonk, Odell, Onarga, Panola, Papineau, Paxton, Piper City, Pontiac, Potomac, Rankin, Reddick, Roanoke, Roberts, Rossville, Saunemin, Secor, Sheldon, Sibley, Thawville, Watseka, Wellington, and Woodland. The district has been represented by Republican Tom Bennett since January 14, 2015. Bennett faced neither any primary challengers nor Democratic challengers before the 2018 general election.

District 107
The 107th district includes all or parts of Alma, Altamont, Beecher City, Bingham, Brownstown, Central City, Centralia, Edgewood, Effingham, Farina, Greenville, Iuka, Junction City, Kell, Keyesport, Kinmundy, Mason, Mulberry Grove, Odin, Old Ripley, Panama, Patoka, Pierron, Pocahontas, Ramsey, Salem, Sandoval, Shumway, Smithboro, Sorento, St. Elmo, St. Peter, Teutopolis, Vandalia, Vernon, Walnut Hill, Wamac, and Watson. The district had been represented by Republican John Cavaletto since January 14, 2009. Cavaletto announced he would not seek another term on September 18, 2017. Former Illinois Army National Guard veteran and former Fayette County Board member Blaine Wilhour ran as the Republican challenger in this election. Former high school teacher of Effingham High School and St. Anthony High School and Lake Land College history instructor David Seiler ran as the Democratic challenger.

District 108
The 108th district, located in the Metro East, includes all or parts of Addieville, Albers, Alhambra, Aviston, Bartelso, Beckemeyer, Breese, Carlyle, Centralia, Damiansville, Edwardsville, Germantown, Grantfork, Hamel, Highland, Hoffman, Hoyleton, Huey, Irvington, Marine, Maryville, Mascoutah, Nashville, New Baden, New Minden, O’Fallon, Oakdale, Okawville, Pierron, Richview, St. Jacob, Summerfield, Trenton, Troy, and Venedy. The district has been represented by Republican Charles Meier since January 9, 2013. Meier faced a primary challenger from Madison County Board Member Don Moore. After winning the nomination, Meier would face no Democratic challenger in the general election.

District 109
The 109th district, located in the Illinois Wabash Valley, includes all or parts of Albion, Allendale, Bellmont, Bone Gap, Bridgeport, Browns, Burnt Prairie, Calhoun, Carmi, Cisne, Claremont, Clay City, Crossville, Dieterich, Enfield, Fairfield, Flora, Golden Gate, Grayville, Iola, Jeffersonville, Johnsonville, Keenes, Keensburg, Louisville, Maunie, Montrose, Mount Carmel, Mount Erie, Newtown, Noble, Norris City, Olney, Parkersburg, Phillipstown, Rose Hill, Sailor Springs, Sims, Springerton, St. Francisville, Ste. Marie, Sumner, Teutopolis, Watson, Wayne City, West Salem, Wheeler, Willow Hill, Xenia, and Yale. The district had been represented by Republican David Reis since January 12, 2005. Reis was challenged by farmer and North Clay Board of Education member Darren Bailey. In a rare victory for candidates supported by Dan Proft's Liberty Principles PAC, Bailey defeated Reis in the 2018 Republican primary. Bailey then defeated Democratic candidate Cynthia Given, the Secretary of the Richland County Democratic Party, in the staunchly Republican district.

District 110
The 110th district includes all or parts of Annapolis, Ashmore, Casey, Charleston, Flat Rock, Greenup, Humboldt, Hutsonville, Jewett, Kansas, Lawrenceville, Lerna, Marshall, Martinsville, Mattoon, Neoga, Oakland, Oblong, Palestine, Robinson, Russellville, Stoy, Toledo, West Union, West York, and Westfield. The district had been represented by Republican Reggie Phillips since January 14, 2015. On September 22, 2017, Phillips announced he would not run for a third term. The Republican challenger in this election was owner of the Miller Brothers Farms Chris Miller. The Democratic challenger was retired Eastern Illinois University professor Shirley Bell.

District 111
The 111th district, located in the Metro East, includes all or parts of Alton, Bethalto, East Alton, Edwardsville, Elsah, Godfrey, Granite City, Hartford, Holiday Shores, Madison, Mitchell,  Pontoon Beach, Rosewood Heights, Roxana, South Roxana, and Wood River. The district had been represented by Democrat Dan Beiser since his appointment in 2004. According to Illinois Election Data, the 111th district was the 4th most Republican district represented by a Democrat during the election. Beiser announced his retirement from the Illinois House of Representatives on August 30, 2017. Monica Bristow, President of the RiverBend Growth Association, was sworn in on December 19, 2017 as his replacement. She would go on to be the Democratic candidate for the general election. The Republican challenger in this election was the Wood River Township Supervisor Mike Babcock, who has previously run for the 111th district in the past.

District 112
The 112th district, located in the Metro East, includes all or parts of Bethalto, Caseyville, Collinsville, Edwardsville, Fairmont City, Fairview Heights, Glen Carbon, Granite City, Madison, Maryville, O'Fallon, Pontoon Beach, Roxana, Shiloh, Swansea, and Wood River. The district has been represented by Democrat Katie Stuart since January 11, 2017. According to Illinois Election Data, the 112th district was the 3rd most Republican district represented by a Democrat during the election. Dwight Kay, former representative of the district, was the Republican challenger in this election.

District 113
The 113th district, located in the Metro East, includes all or parts of Belleville, Brooklyn, Caseyville, Collinsville, East St. Louis, Fairmont City, Fairview Heights, Granite City, Madison, Shiloh, Swansea, Venice, and Washington Park. Democrat Jay Hoffman, who has been a member of the Illinois House of Representatives since January 9, 1991 (with a nine-month interruption in 1997), has represented the district since January 9, 2013. St. Clair County Republican Committee chairman Doug Jameson was the Republican challenger in this election.

District 114
The 114th district, located in the Metro East, includes all or parts of Alorton, Belleville, Cahokia, Centreville, East St. Louis, Fairmont City, Fairview Heights, Freeburg, Lebanon, Mascoutah, Millstadt, O'Fallon, Rentchler, Sauget, Scott Air Force Base, Shiloh, Smithton and Washington Park. The district has been represented by Democrat LaToya Greenwood since January 11, 2017. Centreville Township assessor Jason Madlock was the Republican challenger in this election.

District 115
The 115th district includes all or parts of Alto Pass, Anna, Ashley, Ava, Belle Rive, Bluford, Bonnie, Campbell Hill, Carbondale, Centralia, Cobden, De Soto, Dix, Dongola, Du Bois, Du Quoin, Elkville, Gorham, Grand Tower, Harrison, Ina, Jonesboro, Makanda, Mill Creek, Mount Vernon, Murphysboro, Nashville, Opdyke, Pinckneyville, Radom, Richview, St. Johns, Tamaroa, Vergennes, Waltonville, and Woodlawn. The district has been represented by Republican Terri Bryant since January 14, 2015. Former teacher and Illinois Education Association union leader Marsha Griffin was the Democratic challenger in this election.

District 116
The 116th district, located in parts of the Metro East, includes all or parts of Baldwin, Cahokia, Chester, Columbia, Coulterville, Cutler, Darmstadt, Du Quoin, Dupo, East Carondelet, Ellis Grove, Evansville, Fayetteville, Floraville, Fults, Hecker, Kaskaskia, Lenzburg, Maeystown, Marissa, Millstadt, New Athens, Paderborn, Percy, Pinckneyville, Prairie du Rocher, Red Bud, Rockwood, Ruma, Sauget, Smithton, Sparta, St. Libory, Steeleville, Tilden, Valmeyer, Waterloo, and Willisville. The district has been represented by Democrat Jerry Costello II since January 12, 2011. According to Illinois Election Data, the 116th district was the most Republican district represented by a Democrat during the election. David Friess was the Republican challenger in this year's election.

District 117
The 117th district includes all or parts of Benton, Buckner, Bush, Cambria, Carbondale, Carterville, Christopher, Colp, Crab Orchard, Creal Springs, Energy, Ewing, Freeman Spur, Granville, Hanaford, Herrin, Hurst, Johnston City, Macedonia, Marion, McLeansboro, Mulkeytown, North City, Orient, Pittsburg, Royalton, Sesser, Spillertown, Stonefort, Thompsonville, Valier, West City, West Frankfort, Whiteash, and Zeigler. The district has been represented by Republican Dave Severin since January 11, 2017. Jason Woolard, president of the Southern Illinois Central Labor Council for the AFL-CIO, was the Democratic challenger to Severin in this election.

District 118
The 118th district includes all or parts of Anna, Belknap, Belle Prairie City, Brookport, Broughton, Buncombe, Burnside, Cairo, Carbondale, Carrier Mills, Cave-In-Rock, Cypress, Dahlgren, Dongola, East Cape Girardeau, Eddyville, Eldorado, Elizabethtown, Equality, Galatia, Golconda, Goreville, Harrisburg, Joppa, Junction, Karnak, Makanda, Marion, McClure, McLeansboro, Metropolis, Mound City, Mounds, New Grand Chain, New Haven, Old Shawneetown, Olive Branch, Olmsted, Omaha, Pulaski, Raleigh, Ridgway, Rosiclare, Shawneetown, Simpson, Stonefort, Tamms, Thebes, Ullin, and Vienna. The district had been represented by Democrat Brandon Phelps since January 8, 2003. According to Illinois Election Data, the 118th district was the 2nd most Republican district represented by a Democrat during the election. Phelps stepped down, citing health reasons, and would be replaced by his cousin Natalie Phelps Finnie. Massac County's state's attorney Patrick Windhorst ran in the election as the Republican challenger.

References

Illinois House of Representatives
2018
Illinois House of Representatives